is Dogen's Japanese translation of the Chinese phrase zhǐguǎn dǎzuò (只管打坐 / 祇管 打坐), "just sitting." The phrase was used by his teacher Rujing, a monk of the Caodong school of Zen Buddhism, to refer to the meditation-practice called "Silent Illumination", or "Serene Reflection," taught by the Caodong master Hongzhi Zhengjue (1091-1157). In Japan, it is associated with the Soto school. In shikantaza one does not focus attention on a specific object (such as the breath); instead, practitioners "just sit" in a state of conscious awareness.

Etymology
The term shikantaza is the Sino-Japanese reading of Zhǐguǎn dǎzuò (只管打坐 / 祇管 打坐) "just sitting," "nothing but sitting," "meditation of just sitting," “just mind [yourself] sitting.” Zhǐguǎn dǎzuò (只管打坐 / 祇管打坐) translates as follows:
 zhǐguǎn (只管, J. shikan; or 祇管, with 祇 [zhǐ] serving as a variant of 只 [zhǐ]), "by all means; merely, simply; only concerned with," "to focus exclusively on";
 dǎzuò 打坐, "[Buddhism/Daoism] sit in meditation," "to squat, sit down cross-legged", which corresponds with Sanskrit utkuṭuka-stha;

According to Buswell and Lopez, shikantaza may simply be used by Dogen as a synonym for “sitting in meditation” (zazen), sitting in dhyana, which may also be practiced while walking, standing or lying down.

James Ishmael Ford states that "some trace the root of this word [shikantaza] to the Japanese pronunciation of Sanskrit vipassana, though this is far from certain." This etymological error about 只管 (shikan, "only," "just") is rooted in the fact that Japanese has many homophones pronounced shikan. It stems from a more commonly used Japanese word, namely 止観 (shikan, "concentration and observation" (as practiced by the Tendai sect) that translates the Sanskrit "śamatha and vipaśyanā," the two basic forms of Buddhist meditation.

The phrase zhǐguǎn dǎzuò ("just sitting") was used by Dōgen's teacher Tiantong Rujing (1162-1228) for silent illumination (Chinese mòzhào 默照; Japanese mokushō). According to Koten Benson, in mochao

Practice

Classical sources
"Silent illumination" or "silent reflection" was the hallmark of the Chinese Caodong school of Chan. The first Chan teacher to articulate silent illumination was the Caodong master Hongzhi Zhengjue (1091—1157), who  wrote an inscription entitled "silent illumination meditation" (Mokushō zen 默照禅 or Mòzhào chán 默照禪). 

With the phrase shikantaza Dōgen means "doing only zazen whole-heartedly" or "single-minded sitting."  According to Merv Fowler, shikantaza is described best as "quiet sitting in open awareness, reflecting directly the reality of life." According to Austin, shikantaza is "an alert condition, performed erect, with no trace of sluggishness or drowsiness." Fred Reinhard Dallmayr writes,

Modern sources
Zen master John Daido Loori describes shikantaza as a challenging practice in spite of its simplicity. In it, mental strength (joriki) is not achieved through sustained concentration as in breath meditation, but through awareness of the flow of mind, without actively attempting to let go of a thought. The user must watch its thoughts, "without analyzing them, judging them, attempting to understand or categorize them." According to him, this awareness helps mental activity move on and produce samadhi:

Commenting on Loori's words, meditation expert Eric Harrisons likens it to a psychological process of extinction, in which repeated reduction of a behavioral response eventually leads to no response.

Shunryū Suzuki states about shikantaza, "do not try to stop your mind, but leave everything as it is. Then things will not stay in your mind for so long. Things will come as they come and go as they go." Describing the goal to be simply aware of thoughts without getting caught by it, Sean Murphy cites Taizan Maezumi as advising to "regard our thoughts as if they were clouds, watching them as they drift from one end to the mind to the other, but making no attempt to hold onto them - and when they pass over the horizon, as they inevitably will, making no attempt to grasp after them.

See also
 Buddha-nature
 Abhāvanā
 Dzogchen
 Turiya

Notes

References

Sources
Printed sources

 
 

 

 

 
 

 

 
 

Web-sources

Further reading

Buddhist meditation
Zen
Nondualism
Zazen
Silence